In the United States and Canada, low-speed vehicle (LSV) regulations allow relaxed design and registration laws for four-wheel vehicles that have a maximum capable speed of about . Several other countries have similar regulations.

Canada

Low-speed vehicles are currently street legal in British Columbia, Quebec, and Ontario.

SC Carts was the first Canadian manufacturer to begin producing street legal low-speed vehicles.

France

Quadricycles (the EU vehicle classification covering this type of vehicle) can be driven without a car licence, and are known as voitures sans permis (VSP), literally “cars without licence”. Despite this name, drivers must first sit a written road-safety exam, and be at least 14 years old before legally being allowed to drive this type of vehicle.

Philippines

This regulation was created for the E-jeepney electric-powered minibuses, which were introduced in 2007. The E-jeepney carries 17 passengers and can run 120 km on an 8-hour charge from an electric outlet.

United States

The National Highway Traffic Safety Administration has published safety guidelines in the United States which apply to vehicles operating in the 20–25 mile-per-hour speed range.

States which have specific regulations for LSVs include Alaska, California, Indiana, Iowa,  Kansas, Louisiana,  Maine Maryland, Missouri, New York, Oregon, Rhode Island, South Carolina, Tennessee, Utah and Washington, DC.

Nearly all 50 states allow LSVs, also called Neighborhood Electric Vehicles (NEVs), to drive on their roads where the speed limit is 35 mph or less. Either they follow FMVSS500 (25 mph top speed on 35 mph limit roads), or make their own more aggressive law. However, if modified to exceed , the vehicle then becomes subject to additional safety requirements.

To satisfy federal safety requirements for manufacturers, NEVs must be equipped with three-point seat belts or a lap belt, running lights, headlights, brake lights, reflectors, rear view mirrors, and turn signals; windshield wipers are not required. In many cases, doors may be optional, crash protection from other vehicles is partially met compared to other non-motorized transport such as bicycles because of the use of seat belts. In 2011, a Time magazine article concluded that the lack of passenger safety protection made most LSVs unfit for city driving, despite their excellent maneuverability.

Short commute vehicles 
The term "ultra small vehicle" is also used for similar styles of vehicle.

SCVs are faster than —walking pace—and not regulated by other Motor Vehicle Legislation. It would include vehicles regulated under FMVSS500 (USA Low Speed Vehicle Regulation), CMVSS500 (Canadian Low Speed Vehicle Regulation) and certain L-category vehicles (Quadricycle L6 and L7) in the EU. Battery electric vehicles (BEV) are highly suited as Short Commute Vehicles due to their inherent short operating range; however, SCVs do not have to be BEVs.

Since 2010, the American Association of Retired Persons and Insurance Institute for Highway Safety have expressed concerns about mixed traffic flows including this class of vehicle.

China

See also 
 Battery electric vehicle
 Golf cart
 Medium speed vehicle
 Neighborhood electric vehicle
 Quadricycles

References 

 
Vehicle law

ca:Microcotxe
da:Kabinescooter
es:Microcoche
fr:Voiture sans permis
it:Microcar
nl:Brommobiel
ja:バブルカー
no:Mopedbil
ru:Мотоколяска
fi:Kevyt nelipyörä